Climate change in Tennessee encompasses the effects of climate change, attributed to man-made increases in atmospheric carbon dioxide, in the U.S. state of Tennessee.

Global warming in Tennessee

Global warming in the United States has been a salient topic since the Kyoto Protocol, as part of the United Nations Framework Convention on Climate Change, that was established in 1992. The effects of global warming have been widely debated; however, there is evidence that suggests a slight increase in the core temperature of most states. In addition there seems to be a number of effects on ecological systems throughout the United States. In the state of Tennessee, one of the key effects of global warming seems to be the radical changes to the geological composition as well as wildlife health of the Ohio-Tennessee Basin.

In 2016, the United States Environmental Protection Agency (EPA) reported that "Tennessee's climate is changing. Although the average temperature did not change much during the 20th century, the state has warmed in the last 20 years. Average annual rainfall is increasing, and a rising percentage of that rain is falling on the four wettest days of the year. In the coming decades, the changing climate is likely to reduce crop yields, threaten some aquatic ecosystems, and increase some risks to human health. Floods may be more frequent, and droughts may be longer, which would increase the difficulty of meeting the competing demands for water in the Tennessee and Cumberland rivers". In May 2019, The Kansas City Star noted that although it was not yet possible to say whether climate change was contributing to the increasing number of tornadoes in the region, "the band of states in the central United States ... that each spring are ravaged by hundreds of tornadoes — is not disappearing. But it seems to be expanding", resulting in a higher frequency of tornadoes in states including Tennessee.

Some of the changes to the Ohio-Tennessee Basin include:
 The over enrichment of nutrients in the basin
 A decrease in the size of the basin as measured by the surface area of the watershed
 An increase in the pollutant concentration of the water
Some key legislation that works to address global warming in Tennessee is as follows:

Executive Order 54 establishes the Energy Policy Task Force with the goal of creating a new state energy plan by December 1 of 2008.

Another order establishes the Interagency Alternative Fuels Working Group with the goal of making Tennessee a leader in the biofuels industry.  The Working Group came up with an Alternative Fuels Strategic Plan which lays out goals for increasing biofuel and feedstock production and displacing petroleum use.

Public Chapter 489 (2007) requires all agencies and state educational institutions to create plans by January 1, 2008, to reduce or displace petroleum use in government fleet vehicles by 20%.

Changing water availability

Annual precipitation in Tennessee has increased approximately 5 percent since the first half of the 20th century. But rising temperatures increase evaporation, which dries the soil and decreases the amount of rain that runs off into rivers. Although rainfall during spring is likely to increase during the next 40 to 50 years, the total amount of water running off into rivers or recharging ground water each year is likely to decline 2.5 to 5 percent, as increased evaporation offsets the greater rainfall. Droughts are likely to be more severe, because periods without rain will be longer and very hot days will be more frequent.

Increased flooding

According to the EPA, "flooding is becoming more severe in the Southeast. Since 1958, the amount of precipitation falling during heavy rainstorms has increased by 27 percent in the Southeast, and the trend toward increasingly heavy rainstorms is likely to continue. To prevent serious floods, the Tennessee Valley Authority (TVA) and the U.S. Army Corps of Engineers release water from the reservoirs behind dams they operate before the winter  flood season. Doing so lowers water levels and provides a greater capacity for the reservoirs behind those dams to prevent flooding. Nevertheless, the dams cannot prevent all floods. In May 2003, for example, heavy rains exceeded TVA’s dam capacity, flooding low-lying areas in Chattanooga and other parts of Hamilton County; in 2010, high flows in the Cumberland River flooded Nashville". In March 2021, the state was affected by flooding, causing at least 7 fatalities. Five months later, the state would experience a deadlier major flood event, which caused 20 deaths and at least $100 million worth of damage.

Droughts, navigation, and hydroelectric power

According to the EPA, "droughts also pose challenges for water management. If the spring is unexpectedly dry, reservoirs may have too little water during summer. During droughts, TVA and the Corps of Engineers release water from dams to keep the Tennessee and Cumberland rivers navigable. These rivers support $35 billion in annual shipping. The agencies try to keep channels at least eleven feet deep, because lower river levels can force barges to carry  smaller loads, which increases transportation costs. During the drought of 2007, however, TVA could only release enough water to keep some channels nine feet deep. This release meant that lake levels were lowered tens of feet, which caused problems for recreational swimming and boating. If droughts become more severe, TVA and the Corps of Engineers will face this type of problem more often".

The EPA further reports that "dry years diminish the amount of electricity that TVA can produce from its 19 hydroelectric dams in Tennessee, which provide 12 to 15 percent of the electricity produced in the state. During the 2007 drought, TVA’s hydroelectric plants produced 30 percent less than normal, which forced TVA to meet demand by using more expensive fuel-burning power plants".

Agriculture

According to the EPA, "changing the climate will have both beneficial and harmful effects on agriculture. Longer frost-free growing seasons and increased concentrations of atmospheric carbon dioxide tend to increase yields for many crops during an average year. But more severe droughts and more hot days are likely to reduce yields, especially in the western half of Tennessee: 70 years from now, that part of the state is likely to have 15 to 30 more days with temperatures above 95°F than it has today. Even on irrigated fields, higher temperatures are likely to reduce yields of corn, and possibly soybeans. Warmer temperatures are also likely to reduce the productivity of dairy and other cattle farms".

Forest resources

According to the EPA, "higher temperatures and changes in rainfall are unlikely to substantially reduce forest cover in Tennessee, but the composition of those forests may change. Forests cover about half the state, dominated by oak and hickory trees, and the forest products industry employs 180,000 people. Although more droughts would reduce productivity, longer growing seasons and increased carbon dioxide concentrations could more than offset those losses. Nevertheless, climate change is likely to increase the damage that certain insects and diseases cause in Tennessee's forests".

See also 

 List of U.S. states and territories by carbon dioxide emissions
 Plug-in electric vehicles in Tennessee

References

Further reading
 —this chapter of the National Climate Assessment covers Southeast states (Virginia, West Virginia, North Carolina, South Carolina, Florida, Georgia, Alabama, Mississippi, Tennessee, Arkansas, Louisiana).

Tennessee
Environment of Tennessee